Öland County, or Ölands län, was a county of Sweden, between 1819 and 1826. It consisted of the island of Öland, designating the historical province of Öland as its own county. A Governor resided briefly at Borgholm, but the island is today part of the Kalmar County.  

Some important historical sites in Öland County are: Borgholm Castle, Halltorps Estate, Eketorp fortress and the Gettlinge Gravefield.  Much of Öland County's present day landscape known as the Stora Alvaret has been designated as a World Heritage Site.

Governors 
Axel Adlersparre (1819-1821)
Erik Gustaf Lindencrona (1821-1826)

See also 
List of Kalmar Governors
County Governors of Sweden

Former counties of Sweden
County
1820s in Sweden